Whitney Boddie (born January 23, 1987) is a professional women's basketball player who most recently played for the Sacramento Monarchs.

Boddie graduated in 2005 from Florence High School of Florence, Alabama and was named 2005 Alabama Miss Basketball.

Boddie was drafted by the Sacramento Monarchs in the 2009 WNBA Draft but she was waived before the season began. When Monarchs guard Chelsea Newton had surgery in August 2009, the Monarchs signed Boddie to a seven-day contract.

Auburn statistics
Source

References 

1987 births
Living people
American women's basketball players
Auburn Tigers women's basketball players
Basketball players from Alabama
Sportspeople from Florence, Alabama
Sacramento Monarchs players
Guards (basketball)